"True to Your Heart" is the "end-credits song" of Disney's 1998 animated film Mulan, and one of two singles released off the soundtrack. It was written by Matthew Wilder and David Zippel and performed by American recording artists 98 Degrees and Stevie Wonder. The song was also included on the band's second album, 98 Degrees and Rising. 

Critics felt the song was vibrant but ultimately seemed out of place in the Mulan film and soundtrack.

Production 
Matthew Wilder & David Zippel had written the song originally for Hanson, but the deal eventually fell through. They were subsequently asked to alter the song to give it a "Stevie Wonder feel". The writers previously had the opportunity to work with famous performers like dubbing artist Marni Nixon, though were "excited and astonished" to work with Wonder. Wilder recalled: "While sitting in the studio waiting for Wonder's arrival, some guy walks in and sets up a keyboard and then walks out with saying a word. After several hours passed, Wonder finally arrived. I peaked my head out into the hallway in time to see him floating down this long hallway in this floor-length dashiki. He looked like an African god." Wilder and Zippel didn't have a clear collaboration in mind when calling Wonder into the studio. Initially they had asked him to play harmonica on the track. Wonder said that he liked the song, describing it as "a song I would've written back in the '70s and I’m into it" and offered to sing on it.

Meanwhile, 98 Degrees had recently released their debut album with just one single "Invisible Man" and the album failed to chart. The band's next creative step following this was to explore the international markets of Asia and Europe and record "True to Your Heart" with Stevie Wonder for Disney's Mulan soundtrack which led them to wider recognition.

Release 
The song was released as the first single off the soundtrack and was nominated for the 1998 Grammy Awards in the category of Best Song Written Specifically for a Motion Picture or for Television. The song has different lyrics in the movie than on the soundtrack. The song reached 51 on the Adult Contemporary chart in 1998.

Sandy and Jr. interpreted the song in Portuguese as "Seu Coração".

Raven-Symoné recorded a cover of the song in 2004 for the soundtrack to Ella Enchanted and Disneymania 2. Both versions were released on 2004's Mulan: Special Edition.

Track listing
UK CD single
"True To Your Heart" (performed by 98 Degrees, Stevie Wonder) – 4:18
"True To Your Heart" (Instrumental) – 4:16
"Was It Something I Didn't Say" (performed by 98 Degrees) – 5:02

UK & European CD maxi single
"True To Your Heart" (performed by 98 Degrees, Stevie Wonder) – 4:15
"True To Your Heart" (Instrumental) – 4:15
"True To Your Heart" (98° Vocal Version) (performed by 98 Degrees) – 4:15

European CD single
"True To Your Heart" (performed by 98 Degrees, Stevie Wonder) – 4:15
"True To Your Heart" (Instrumental) – 4:15

Australian CD single
"True To Your Heart" (performed by 98 Degrees, Stevie Wonder) – 4:15
"I'll Make A Man Out Of You" (performed by Donny Osmond) – 3:21

Japanese CD single
"True To Your Heart" (LP Version) (performed by 98 Degrees, Stevie Wonder) – 4:16
"Because Of You" (LP Version) (performed by 98 Degrees) – 4:56
"Because Of You" (Radio Edit) (performed by 98 Degrees) – 3:55

French Promo CD single
"True To Your Heart" (Radio Edit) (performed by 98 Degrees, Stevie Wonder) – 4:15

US Promo CD single
"True To Your Heart" (performed by 98 Degrees, Stevie Wonder) – 4:16

UK & European Promo CD single
"True To Your Heart" (Radio Edit) (performed by 98 Degrees, Stevie Wonder) – 4:15

UK Promo CD single
"True To Your Heart" (performed by 98 Degrees, Stevie Wonder) – 4:15

Japanese Promo CD single
"True To Your Heart" (LP Version) (performed by 98 Degrees, Stevie Wonder) – 4:16
"Because Of You" (LP Version) (performed by 98 Degrees) – 4:56
"Because Of You" (Radio Edit) (performed by 98 Degrees) – 3:55

Critical reception 
MTV described it as a "celebratory tune that captures the mood of the film's conclusion" a la "Circle of Life". Soundtrack.net felt the song "seems very out of place on this soundtrack". NPO3FM deemed the song the "big breakthrough" of 98 Degrees. DVDDizzy deemed it "catchy but out-of-left-field" and a "soundtrack anomaly", though added that the music video does a "good job at inspiring laughter". CinemaBlend felt the singers were "crooning" in the song. Billboard deemed it the 22nd best Disney Renaissance song, deeming it a "pretty promising combination" of artists, who "lived up to the hype with this playful, harmonica-flavored boy band jam".

Animated Views deemed Raven-Symone's version "over-emoted".

References

External links

Disney Renaissance songs
Songs from Mulan (franchise)
Songs with lyrics by David Zippel
Songs written by Matthew Wilder
Stevie Wonder songs
Motown singles
Walt Disney Records singles
98 Degrees songs
1998 songs
1998 singles
1990s ballads
Vocal collaborations